|}

The Vintage Crop Stakes is a Listed flat horse race in Ireland open to thoroughbreds aged four years or older. It is run at Navan over a distance of 1 mile and 6 furlongs (2,816 metres), and it is scheduled to take place each year in April.

The race was first run, as a Listed race, in 2003. It was upgraded to Group Three status from 2014.  The race was a furlong shorter until 2011.

The race is named after Vintage Crop, an Irish-trained racehorse of the 1990s who won the Irish St. Leger twice and became the first European runner to win the Melbourne Cup, in 1993.

From 2022, the Vintage Crop Stakes downgraded to listed race while reforming Irish staying races in early season.

Records
Most successful horse (2 wins):
Fame and Glory – 2011, 2012
 Yeats  – 2007, 2008

Leading jockey (3 wins):
Seamie Heffernan – Yeats (2007, 2008), Bondi Beach (2016)

Leading trainer (8 wins):
 Aidan O'Brien – Yeats (2007, 2008), Fame and Glory (2011, 2012), Leading Light (2014), Bondi Beach (2016), Order of St George (2018), Kyprios (2022)

Winners

See also
 Horse racing in Ireland
 List of Irish flat horse races

References

Racing Post:

 ifhaonline.org – International Federation of Horseracing Authorities – Vintage Crop Stakes (2019).

Open long distance horse races
Navan Racecourse
Flat races in Ireland